The 2019–20 season was Ayr United's 2nd season in the Scottish Championship after being promoted from league one in the 2017–18 season. Ayr also competed in the Challenge Cup, League Cup and the Scottish Cup. On 13 March 2020 all SPFL leagues were indefinitely suspended due to the coronavirus pandemic.

Summary

Season
Ayr began the season on 3 August 2019 and was scheduled to end on 2 May 2020. On 8 April 2020, the SPFL proposed to end the 2019–20 season by utilising a points per game ratio to determine the final standings. The plan was approved on 15 April 2020, declaring that the season was over, with Dundee United being named as title winners and relegating Partick Thistle to League One.

Results and fixtures

Scottish Championship

Scottish League Cup

Scottish Challenge Cup

Scottish Cup

Squad statistics

Appearances

|-
|colspan="10"|Players who left the club during the 2019–20 season
|-

|}

Team statistics

League table

League Cup table

Transfers

Transfers in

Transfers out

Loans in

Loans out

References 

Ayr United F.C. seasons
Ayr